Grace Bank, formerly Barcadares, is an unincorporated hamlet 33 miles up the Belize River. It was the second settlement founded by the first English settlers of present-day Belize. It was settled in the 1650s, relocated in 1760, and resettled in 1853.

History

Prior to English settlement

Pre-Columbian 

Grace Bank's immediate surroundings were likely first settled by nomadic Paleo-indians prior to the 8th millennium BC, during the Lithic period of Mesoamerica. Mayan farmers founded permanent settlements in the area by the 2nd millennium BC, during the Archaic period of Mesoamerica. By the 16th century, the region formed part of Dzuluinicob, a Postclassic Mayan state.

Columbian

Rise of Spanish dominion, 15281544 

Sixteenth century residents of the area first became aware of Spaniards in 1502, with the 30 July landing of Christopher Columbus in Guanaja. On 8 December 1526, Francisco de Montejo was named adelantado of the Yucatan peninsula (including the territory of ). The Spanish conquest reached the area in the third quarter of 1528, during Montejo's southern . Some or most of the area's surviving residents were (forcibly) relocated to  towns closer to Bacalar, and (forcibly) converted to Roman Catholicism.

A secular parish was (belatedly) established at Bacalar in 1565 by Pedro de la Costa.

Fall of Spanish dominion, 16381642 

In 1638, Tipu lead the area into general revolt against Bacalar, resulting in the collapse of Spanish power over the region by 1642, and the relocation of a majority of the area's residents to Tipu.

English settlement

Anglo-Dutch piracy, 16171650s 

Pirates are first thought to have arrived near Grace Bank in 1617, during a raid of Bacalar by English pirates or privateers. In the 1630s, pirates were further attracted to the region by the increasing willingness of Spanish residents to trade with non-Spaniards, and the possibility of abducting Mayan residents for impressment or sale at non-Spanish slave markets. Belize City is thought to have been settled in 1638, by a crew of shipwrecked buccaneers.

English logging, 1650s1763 

The early buccaneer settlers (now Baymen) turned to logging logwood in the 1650s, when they are thought to have settled Grace Bank (then Barcadares).

Anglo-Spanish hostilities, 1650s1763 

Barcadares's settlers opened conflict against Bacalar on 29 May 1652, when they are thought to have lead or been involved in that 's sacking. Spanish Yucatan retaliated during 16 November 169428 February 1695 with a paramilitary campaign against the Baymen's camps and settlements, thereby presaging over a century of Anglo-Spanish conflict that would eventually lead to the relocation of Barcadares. This campaign lead to the first (of many) evacuations of the Baymen's settlements. Spanish Yucatan also tightened its control of the waters off the Belize River beginning on 2 November 1705 with the arrival of privateers or  Archibaldo Magdonel de Narión and Francisco Joseph Jiménez with 30 men aboard two .

The final campaign against Barcadares occurred on 25 December 1759, when 150 Spaniards aboard a 'great number' of  landed in the port of Belize. This coup de grâce resulted in the imprisonment of a number of Baymen, the seizure of several loaded flats, the burning of Barcadares and nearby logging camps, and a nearly three-year evacuation of all settlements (in favour of the safer Mosquito Shore).

Geography

Political 

Grace Bank is not known to have been settled by Mayans. It is presently part of the Belize District of Belize.

Physical 

Grace Bank lies on the northern bank of the Belize River, near its confluence with Francisco Creek, some eight or nine miles inland (as the crow flies) from the Caribbean Sea. It is 33 miles up the river, past Davis Bank, just before Lime Walk. It lies just south of Jones Lagoon, and west of Potts Creek Lagoon.

Geologically, xxx

Climate 
Grace Bank has a tropical monsoon climate (Köppen climate classification Am), with a MayNovember wet and a DecemberApril dry season.

Demographics

Government 

Grace Bank is currently part of the Belize Rural South constituency, and is represented in Parliament by Marconi Leal MP.

Economy

Society

Legacy

Notes

Citations

References

News

Journals

Theses

Print 

 
 
 
 
 
 
 
 
 
 
 

 
 
 
 
 
 
 
 
 
 
 
 
 
 
 
 
 
 
 
 
 
 
 
 
 
 
 
 

Populated places in Belize District
Belize Rural North